Vidya Bharati Chinmaya Vidyalaya, Jamshedpur ( Chinmaya Jamshedpur ), is an English medium school established on 1 February 1979. The school is affiliated with the Central Board of Secondary Education, Jharkhand, India. The school is run by the Chinmaya Mission and is a part of Chinmaya Vidyalayas. The school was established under the patronage of Tata Motors (then Telco) which helped the school with basic necessities like power and water supply.

Chinmaya Vidyalya has been one of the leading schools in the industrial city of Jamshedpur in academics over the years. The current principal of the school is Mrs. Mina Wilkhu, and Mr. Manas Mishra is the chairman. Students get all types of education here.

External links
 School webpage
 Chinmaya Vidyalas  

Educational institutions established in 1979
Schools in Jharkhand
Education in Jamshedpur
Schools affiliated with the Chinmaya Mission
1979 establishments in Bihar